Mount McCausland is a mountain in the U.S state of Washington located in the Okanogan-Wenatchee National Forest east of Stevens Pass. It's a popular hike that has views of nearby Lake Valhalla and Lichtenberg Mountain.

See also 
 Mountain peaks of North America
 Mountain peaks of the United States
 Lake Valhalla
 Lichtenberg Mountain

References 

Cascade Range
McCausland
McCausland
McCausland